The International Design Awards are a group of awards that recognize, celebrate and promote design visionaries and emerging talent in architecture, interior, product, graphic and fashion design.

History
A handful of designers, thinkers and entrepreneurs created the International Design Awards in 2007 as a response to the lack of recognition and celebration for smart and sustainable multidisciplinary design.

The International Design Awards were developed by Farmani Group. Recipients of Designer of the Year or Emerging Designer of the Year are awarded by invitation to the biannual International Design Awards gala in Los Angeles, a press campaign including links to their website reaching over 100,000 design professionals, press and potential clients, inclusion in the International Design Awards Design Directory and their Gallery of Winning Work, a feature in the International Design Awards Book of Designs, which is distributed to museums and design bookstores internationally, an International Design Awards Certificate of Achievements and permission to use the International Design Awards Winner's Seal on their website and printed materials.

Farmani Group assembled IDA as the design sibling of the Annual Lucie Awards for Photography.

Honorees

2007
Designer of the Year: 
Architect of the Year - Skidmore, Owings & Merrill LLP - Al-Rajhi Bank Headquarters 
Fashion Design of the Year - JC Obando - Fall 2007 
Graphic Design of the Year – Volume Inc. - SFMOMA Poster 
Interior Design of the Year – Ministry of Design – SHO U 
Product Design of the Year – Humanscale Design Studio – T5 
Emerging Designer of the Year: 
Architect of the Year – Orangelabs Studio – Biomedical Research Institute 
Graphic Design of the Year – Student – Symbols to Cultivate Change 
Interior Design of the Year – Timothy Schreiber – Evolution_Table 
Product Design of the Year – Pratt Institute – The Min. Chair

2008
Designer of the Year: 
Architect of the Year – PTW Architects with ARUP and CCDI – The Watercube 
Fashion Design of the Year – Toni Maticevski – Maticevski Spring Summer 2009 
Graphic Design of the Year – ICONISUS L & Y – Nip/tuck Operation Table 
Interior Design of the Year – Simone Micheli Architectural Hero – New Urban Face 
Product Design of the Year – Karten Design – Simple Tech Simple Drive 
Emerging Designer of the Year: 
Architect of the Year – Vahan Misakyan – Project of a Hotel 
Fashion Design of the Year – Bonkuk Koo – Fashion Institute of Technology – Deep Black Sea 
Graphic Design of the Year – Alexandra Krietzsch – Rotary Watch Packaging 
Interior Design of the Year – RMIT University – Restaurant of the Earthly Deli 
Product Design of the Year – Shelly Shelly - Loft

2009
Designer of the Year: 
Architect of the Year – Architecton – K Clinic 
Fashion Designer of the Year – Society for Rational Dress – Society for Rational Dress 
Graphic Designer of the Year – Clif Bar Creative Group – Clif Bar Eco Challenge 
Interior Designer of the Year – Kossmann.dejong – Lee future center 
Product Designer of the Year – fuseproject – Mission ONE Motorbike 
Emerging Designer of the Year: 
Architect of the Year – Studio 804 – Springfield Residence 
Graphic Designer of the Year – Derek Heinze Texas A & M – Commerce – SIGG Aluminum Bottles 
Interior Designer of the Year – Moscow State Stroganov Academy Design and Applied Arts – **Contemporary art center 
Product Designer of the Year – Alper Gunduz - https://idesignawards.com/winners/zoom.php?eid=9-3564-09

2010
Designer of the Year: 
Architect of the Year – Henning Larsen Architects A/S – Batumi Aquarium 
Fashion Designer of the Year – KWARK – Kasia. N summer 10 
Graphic Designer of the Year – Love for Art & Business – The Royal Wedding 
Interior Designer of the Year – Ministry of Design – Leo BURNETT 
Product Designer of the Year – fuseproject – Herman Miller SAYL Chair 
Emerging Designer of the Year: 
Architect of the Year – Yashin Kemal – Bus Terminal, Beijing, China 
Fashion Designer of the Year – Si Kim/Morpholision – Morphology Vision 
Graphic Designer of the Year – Tiffany Chui/Blue Coin Design Loft LP – NATURE'S FRESH COLOUR 
Interior Designer of the Year – UCO – making 5 different functional 
Product Designer of the Year – AMV-Design – Edge Desk

2011
Designer of the Year: 
Architecture of the Year – Bates Masi + Architects – Sam's Creek 
Fashion Design of the Year – Rei Kawakubo, founder and designer, Junya Watanabe, Tao Kurihara, Fumito Ganryu, Adrian Joffe designers – 2011 Collection 
Graphic Designer of the Year – Andrew J. Nilsen [Art director] Brian Stauffer [Illustrator] – Worlds Apart 
Interior Design of the Year – One Plus Partnership Limited – Wuhan Pixel Box Cinema 
Product Design of the Year – Fisker Automotive – Fisker Karma EVer 
Emerging Designer of the Year: 
Architecture of the Year – Bryant Lau Liang Cheng – Amalgamation 
Product Designer of the Year – Jesse Leeworthy – Ishke 
Graphic Design of the Year – Fung, Cheng-Wen – Money Attack 
Interior Design of the Year – KBU International College – Mecanique Toy Store

2012
Designer of the Year: 
Architecture of the Year – Ward+Blake Architects – EarthWall 2 
Fashion Design of the Year – Ashish Gupta Fall 2012 
Graphic Design of the Year – CASA REX – 14th USP Book Festival 
Interior Design of the Year – Nikken Space Design LTD – THE ROPPONGI TOKYO 
Product Design of the Year – One & Co – Windows Phone 8S 
Emerging Designer of the Year: 
Architecture of the Year – Bryant Lau Liang Cheng – Metamorphosis 
Fashion Design of the Year – Eunsol Ansley Lee – Movement as Fashion-Art 
Graphic Design of the Year – Temple University – Junction 
Interior Design of the Year – banozic architecture/scenography – Trillusion 
Product Design of the Year – Steam Beam

2014 
Designer of the Year: 
Architecture of the Year – PLUS-SUM Studio – Guggenheim Helsinki 
Fashion Design of the Year – Paragon Design Limited - Wearable art 2013 
Graphic Design of the Year – CASA REX – Campari Gift Box 
Interior Design of the Year –  Gensler  – San Francisco International Airport, Terminal 3, Boarding Area E 
Product Design of the Year – Studio Backs – Vessel Kitchen 
Emerging Designer of the Year: 
Architecture of the Year – VAK Studio  – QUAD ONE Module Housing 
Fashion Design of the Year –  CADAVER  –  Obsolescence 
Graphic Design of the Year – WOODBURY UNIVERSITY  – Icelandic Cultural Center Logo 
Interior Design of the Year – PBSA Duesseldorf/ Germany 
Product Design of the Year – The University of Nottingham (UNNC) - The Smart Sofa

2015
 
Design of the Year:
Architectural Design of the Year – Arup Associates – Singapore National Stadium 
Fashion Design of the Year – Gabriele Colangelo – Spring & Summer 2015
Graphic Design of the Year – Mert Kizilay – Frank Riggio – TTT
Interior Design of the Year – [Gwenael Nicolas] – Palazzo Fendi
Product Design of the Year – Volvo Cars – The all-new 2016 XC90
Emerging Designer of the Year:
Emerging Architectural Designer of the Year – Arezou Zaredar - Five Senses Museum
Emerging Fashion Designer of the Year – Savannah College of Art and Design- Haint II
Emerging Graphic Designer of the Year – Jiyoung Oh- Their Danger, A dangerous Commute
Emerging Interior Designer of the Year – Tara Headley- Promoting Peace and Cultural understanding between the United States and the Middle East through experience design. 
Emerging Product Designer of the Year – Sean Naderzad Aaron Mazikowski- The Seamless

2016 

Design of the Year:
Architectural Design of the Year – Stinessen Arkitektur -  Manshausen Island Resort 
Fashion Design of the Year – Alisa Sibgatova – Witch Craft – - New Classics
Graphic Design of the Year – Phoenix The Creative Studio– Cannes Lions Survival Kit 
Interior Design of the Year – Panorama International Ltd.– Wateryard House  
Product Design of the Year – Elica S.p.A.– Nikolatesla  
Emerging Designer of the Year:
Emerging Architectural Designer of the Year – Reyhane Sanati - Mothers & babies Care center
Emerging Fashion Designer of the Year – Savannah College of Art and Design- Tibet Woman
Emerging Graphic Designer of the Year – Yu-Jia Huang - Baskerville: Eyewear & More
Emerging Interior Designer of the Year – National Taipei University of Technology - 
Natural Healing Workshop
Emerging Product Designer of the Year – Mohammadamir Safari- Aalto Chair

2017

Design of the Year:
Architectural Design of the Year – fjmt-Bunjil Place
Fashion Design of the Year – //JENS_LAUGESEN - HYreCON 01 TRILOGY / AW18 collection
Graphic Design of the Year – Open - ACLU visual identity
Interior Design of the Year – Mesura - Can Llimona
Product Design of the Year - Elica S.p.A. - Lullaby
Emerging Designer of the Year:
Emerging Architectural Designer of the Year – Najafabad Branch Islamic Azad University (Iaun)-Hotel Bio
Emerging Fashion Designer of the Year – Savannah College of Art and Design - Suora
Emerging Graphic Designer of the Year – Savannah College of Art and Design - Nihilism For Beginners
Emerging Interior Designer of the Year – British Higher School of Art and Design - Center For Multimedia Arts "ges-2"
Emerging Product Designer of the Year –Islamic Art University of Tabriz - BlackHoleHood

2018
Design of the Year:
Architectural Design of the Year – Challenge Design - Yuanlu Community Center in Chongqing
Fashion Design of the Year – Nanushka- Nanushka Pre-Fall 2019 collection
Graphic Design of the Year – BRED – Drew’s ABCs
Interior Design of the Year – Gensler - Gusto
Product Design of the Year - Valery Graznov & Semenko Design - Uslon Life-saving swimwear
Emerging Designer of the Year:
Emerging Architectural Designer of the Year – Instituto Marangoni Milano Design School - Taino Interpretation Centre
Emerging Fashion Designer of the Year – Central Saint Martins- Bunker Office 
Emerging Graphic Designer of the Year – School of Visual Arts - Sakura Matsuri: Cherry Blossom Festival
Emerging Interior Designer of the Year – New York School of Interior Design - M hotel 
Emerging Product Designer of the Year – Ming Chi University of Technology - RBTT

2019 
Design of the Year:

Architectural Design of the Year – Domaen Ltd - ARB Residence
Fashion Design of the Year – Gavin Rajah Atelier - Cleopatra in Africa
Graphic Design of the Year – Logitech Europe S.A. - G502 LIGHTSPEED Wireless Gaming Mouse Video
Interior Design of the Year – fujian Wuje Decoration Design Engineering Co. Ltd - WUJE
Product Design of the Year - Neuron EV - TORQ

2020 
Design of the Year:

Architectural Design of the Year – One Sino Park - aoe
Fashion Design of the Year – V VISSI: revisit - Collection of Sustainability - V Visionary Design Studio
Graphic Design of the Year – Ergo Characters - Logitech Europe S.A.
Interior Design of the Year – Switch Bahrain - Karim Rashid Inc
Product Design of the Year - Lotus Evija - Lotus Cars

2021 
Design of the Year:

Architectural Design of the Year – The Hometown Moon - SYN Architects, Zou Yingxi
Fashion Design of the Year – mul·ti·po·lar—ex·ist·ence - Kyle Denman
Graphic Design of the Year – Pepsi Culture Can LTO - Mexico - Pepsico Design & Innovation, Pepsico Design & Innovation
Interior Design of the Year – Church of Beatified Restitute - Atelier Štěpán s.r.o., Marek Štěpán
Product Design of the Year - Maserati MC20 - Maserati S.p.a.

References

External links
 idesignawards.com

Design awards